PropEquity, based in India, is an online subscription based real estate data and analytics platform covering 40 cities in India. , the company was in talks with Housing.com for a takeover by the latter; but the deal was called off due to internal conflict between investors and the founders.

Work
The Gurgaon-based company is aiding Reserve Bank of India in creating India’s first Housing Start-up Index. It has offices in Gurgaon, Vasant Vihar, Mumbai and Bangalore. It has also tied up with Multi Commodity Exchange of India to develop and launch India’s most comprehensive real estate index, which will be traded in the Option and Futures market. It will be soon launching a consumer vertical to cater exclusively to retail consumers who want to invest in the real estate sector.

See also
 Cash flow statement
 Real estate development
 Real estate investing

References

External links
PropEquity official website

Indian real estate websites